Hatton is a census-designated place and unincorporated community in Lawrence County, Alabama, United States. Its population was 261 as of the 2010 census.

Education
Hatton, AL, is served by Hatton Elementary school, which includes Kindergarten through 6th Grade, and Hatton High School, which includes Grades 7–12. Both schools are part of the Lawrence County School System. The elementary school serves 472 students and the high school serves 422 students. The high school is classified as a 2A School by the Alabama High School Athletic Association. As of 2020–2021, the Hatton Hornet Athletic Program has won 21 State Championships; 3 in slow-pitch softball (1992, 1993, 1996), 5 in fast-pitch softball (2010, 2011, 2012, 2013, 2017), 4 in women's volleyball (1990, 1991, 1992, 1993), 2 in women's basketball (2002, 2004), 1 in men's basketball (1964), and 6 in men's cross country (2003, 2008, 2009, 2010, 2012, 2020). Additionally, the school has finished state runners-up on many occasions.

Demographics

References

Census-designated places in Lawrence County, Alabama
Census-designated places in Alabama